Ali Ceesay (born 10 October 1992) is a Gambian football defender, who last played for Skonto Rīga in the Latvian Higher League.

Club career

MŠK Žilina
Ali Ceesay started his football career playing for Samger. Ceesay transferred to Žilina in spring 2011. His older brother Momodou is also a footballer. Ali made his debut for Žilina against Košice on 25 May 2011.

MFK Zemplín Michalovce
Ceesay joined Zemplín Michalovce in July 2011 on a one-year loan from Žilina. He made his debut for the club against Tatran Liptovský Mikuláš on 23 August 2011 in the 2011–12 Slovak Cup.

FC ŠTK 1914 Šamorín
In Summer 2012 Ceesay left Žilina yet again to play for ŠTK 1914 Šamorín on a one-year loan.

Skonto Rīga
In March 2014 the Latvian Higher League club Skonto Rīga announced the signing of Ali Ceesay for the upcoming season. He became the first ever Gambian player to play in the Latvian championship. He left the club in mid-season, being unable to settle in the first eleven.

References

External links
MŠK Žilina profile

Footballdatabase.eu profile

1992 births
Living people
Sportspeople from Banjul
Gambian footballers
Association football defenders
The Gambia international footballers
MŠK Žilina players
MFK Zemplín Michalovce players
FC ŠTK 1914 Šamorín players
2. Liga (Slovakia) players
Slovak Super Liga players
Skonto FC players
Latvian Higher League players
Gambian expatriate sportspeople in Slovakia
Gambian expatriate sportspeople in Latvia
Expatriate footballers in Slovakia
Expatriate footballers in Latvia